Takiyeh Owlad Qobad (also Romanized as Takīyeh Owlād Qobād and Takīyeh Olādqobād) is a village in Kuhdasht-e Shomali Rural District, in the Central District of Kuhdasht County, Lorestan Province, Iran. At the 2006 census, its population was 281, in 53 families.

References 

Towns and villages in Kuhdasht County